Almunia is a surname. Notable people with the surname include:

Joaquín Almunia, Spanish politician and current European Commissioner for Competition
Manuel Almunia, Spanish footballer

Almunia is also the name of an Italian electronic music duo.

See also
Almunia de San Juan, a municipality in the province of Huesca, Aragon, Spain
La Almunia de Doña Godina, a municipality in the province of Zaragoza, Aragon, Spain